The 98th Indianapolis 500 was held at the Indianapolis Motor Speedway in Speedway, Indiana on Sunday May 25, 2014. It is the premier event of the 2014 Verizon IndyCar Series season. Tony Kanaan entered the race as the defending champion. Ed Carpenter won the pole position, his second consecutive pole at Indy. The race was won by Ryan Hunter-Reay, the first American-born winner since Sam Hornish Jr. in 2006. Hunter-Reay held off second place Hélio Castroneves by a margin of 0.0600 seconds, the second-closest finish in race history. Marco Andretti, Carlos Muñoz, and Juan Pablo Montoya rounded out the top five. Kurt Busch, in sixth position, claimed Rookie of the Year honors.

The month of May activities opened with the inaugural Grand Prix of Indianapolis, which was won by Simon Pagenaud on May 10. Practice opened for the Indy 500 on Sunday, May 11. Time trials were held over two days, May 17–18, and a post-qualifying practice was held on May 19. The traditional final day of practice, dubbed Carb Day, was held on Friday, May 23.

All four divisions of the Road to Indy ladder participated in the month of May activities. The Cooper Tires Indy Lights held the Liberty Challenge and Freedom 100. The Pro Mazda Series and U.S. F2000 held races on the Speedway's road course, then held oval races at nearby Lucas Oil Raceway. The Stadium Super Trucks series also held an event on Carb Day.

Event background
In September 2013 an IndyCar feasibility test was conducted on the Indianapolis Motor Speedway combined road course, in preparations for a possible road course race. In October 2013, the inaugural Grand Prix of Indianapolis was scheduled for Saturday, May 10, 2014.

Jim Nabors performed "Back Home Again in Indiana" before the 2014 race, marking his 35th and final time doing so.  On March 25 the 83-year-old Nabors announced that he would retire from performing at the 500 because his health limits his travel from his Hawaii home.

Schedule
Track activity commenced on Tuesday April 29 with a refresher test for Jacques Villeneuve and Kurt Busch on the oval. On Wednesday April 30, a full-field Open Test was held on the Indianapolis Motor Speedway road course. The annual Rookie Orientation Program was held on Monday May 5. The events for the inaugural Grand Prix of Indianapolis were held over three days, May 8 to 10. On Sunday May 11, the circuit was reset to the oval configuration, and practice for the Indy 500 began.

For the first time in modern history, a post-qualifying practice session (other than Carb Day) will be held on the Monday following time trials. The track will be open on Monday May 19 from 12:00–5:00 p.m.

* Includes days where track activitywas significantly limited due to rain

ROP — denotes Rookie Orientation Program

Entry list

The race had six former Indianapolis 500 winners entered, including two drivers returning for the first time in over a decade. Defending champion Tony Kanaan and Scott Dixon drove for Ganassi. Three-time winner Hélio Castroneves returned with Penske. He was joined by 2000 winner Juan Pablo Montoya, who returned to the Indy 500 for the first time since his victory, after spending time in Formula One and NASCAR.

Jacques Villeneuve announced he would return to the 500 with Sam Schmidt Motorsports. It was his first appearance since his victory in 1995 (this would mean Montoya, Villeneuve and Tony Kanaan would all be attempting to win the race twice consecutively). 1996 winner Buddy Lazier also returned to the 500 with Lazier Partners Racing. Lazier drove for this team in 2013, as well.

Three-time Indy 500 winner, and four-time IndyCar champion Dario Franchitti announced his retirement from racing in the fall of 2013, following a crash at Houston. In late March, Franchitti was named as the driver of the pace car.

Former NASCAR Sprint Cup Series champion Kurt Busch, who took a rookie test in 2013, announced he would enter the 500 with Andretti Autosport. He would attempt the Indy/Charlotte "Double Duty", the first driver to do so since Robby Gordon in 2004. Busch was the first NASCAR champion to enter the Indy 500, as fellow Cup champions and Indy 500 starters Bobby Allison, Tony Stewart, and Cale Yarborough had not yet won the NASCAR title at the time they raced at Indianapolis.

All told, the Indianapolis 500 featured, for the first time in history, at least one champion from Formula One, IndyCar, and NASCAR.

Rule changes
A new qualifying format was introduced for 2014. Qualifying was held over two days (Saturday-Sunday), with the pole position winner not determined until the second day. The qualifying procedure were as follows:
On the first day of time trials (Saturday May 17), all cars entered made an attempt to qualify. Qualifying was scheduled from 11:00 am to 5:50 pm. The fastest 33 cars were locked into the starting field. Actual grid positioning, however, was not yet assigned. The top nine cars from Saturday were eligible for the Fast Nine Shootout.
On the second day of time trials (Sunday May 18), the cars that posted times from 10th–33rd would each make a qualifying attempt, beginning at 10:15 am. Saturday times would be erased, and the Sunday times would determine the starting lineup, thus eliminating "Bump Day".
At 2 pm on Sunday, the top nine cars from Saturday will participate in the Fast Nine Shootout to determine the pole position as well as starting positions 2–9.

All engines for 2014 and beyond were required to have Twin-turbos. Single-turbo powerplants were no longer permitted. Previously, only Chevrolet (and for a brief time, Lotus) utilized a twin-turbo. Grid penalties based on unapproved engine changes were eliminated. Previously, unapproved engine changes penalties incurred during the month of May at Indianapolis would be served at the next race of the season (Detroit). Starting in 2014, the penalty will be points deductions to the manufacturers championship. If teams act in deliberate negligence to cause engine failures, the penalty will be starting from the rear of the field.

Starting in 2014, IndyCar championship points for the Indianapolis 500, as well as the Pocono 500 and MAVTV 500 (Fontana) will be doubled compared to the other races on the schedule.

Testing and Rookie orientation

Refresher tests – Tuesday April 29

The first track activity for 2014 was a refresher test involving two drivers, race rookie Kurt Busch and former winner Jacques Villeneuve. Both drivers passed their refresher test without incident. The 25-lap formal refresher test consists of the second and third phases of the official rookie test. Busch, who initially passed a rookie test in 2013, returned to the Speedway in preparations for attempting Double Duty. Villeneuve, the 1995 winner, made his first competitive laps on the oval in an Indy car since his victory in 1995. The scheduled session ended shortly after 4 p.m. due to moisture.

Weather:

Rookie Orientation – Monday May 5

Seven drivers took part in the annual Rookie Orientation Program. The official rookie test consisted of three phases (10 laps at 200–205 mph, 15 laps at 205–210 mph, and 15 laps at over 210 mph). Six of the seven drivers passed all three phases. Sage Karam passed only the first two phases due to mechanical problems. The drivers completed 622 laps without incident. Kurt Busch, who completed a refresher test on April 29, returned to the track for more practice time. He completed 180 laps, and also took part in pit stop practice.

Weather: , mostly sunny

Practice

Sunday May 11 – Opening Day practice

Opening Day practice saw Team Penske sweep the top of the speed chart. Early in the afternoon, rookie Sage Karam completed his rookie test. A total of 24 drivers completed 731 laps without incident. A brief yellow for lightning in the area closed the track around 4 p.m., but rain did not fall at the Speedway. E. J. Viso drove in substitution for James Hinchcliffe at Andretti Autosport. A day earlier during the Grand Prix of Indianapolis, Hinchcliffe suffered a concussion after debris struck him in the helmet. He was sidelined until cleared to drive by physicians.

Weather: , mostly cloudy

Monday May 12 – Practice

Ryan Hunter-Reay became the first driver to break the 225 mph barrier during practice. A total of 30 drivers completed 2,286 laps without major incident. Ed Carpenter suffered mechanical issues during the day. At 4:48 p.m. Carpenter's car slowed on the track with smoke trailing from the car, bringing out a yellow.

Weather: , mostly cloudy

Tuesday May 13 – Practice

A total of 30 drivers completed 1,024 laps during an abbreviated practice session on Tuesday. Thunderstorms closed the track for the day shortly before 2 p.m. E. J. Viso, driving in substitution for James Hinchcliffe, led the speed chart with Andretti Autosport teammate Kurt Busch second. Juan Pablo Montoya posted the third-fastest speed of the day, but his day ended prematurely when his car stalled in turn four with an apparent mechanical failure.

Weather: , thunderstorms

Wednesday May 14 – Practice

Rain delayed the start of practice until 5:00 p.m. Due to the delay, officials extended the practice session until 7:00 p.m. A total of 29 drivers completed 1,044 laps in a busy session. Just after 6 p.m., rookie Jack Hawksworth lost control and did a half spin in turn three, and crashed into the outside wall. It was the first crash of the month. Hawksworth was not injured. Simon Pagenaud, who won the Grand Prix of Indianapolis, turned the fastest lap of the day. He became the first driver over 226 mph for the month. At 6:24 p.m., light rain began to fall once again, and the track was closed for the day.

Weather: , rain

Thursday May 15 – Practice

The busiest day of practice thus far saw 34 drivers complete 2,516 laps. In the final hour, Hélio Castroneves completed the fastest lap of the month, the first driver over 227 mph. Three drivers – rookie James Davison, Buddy Lazier, and James Hinchcliffe – took their first laps of the week. Hinchcliffe was back out on the track after being clear to drive after his concussion. Both E. J. Viso and Pippa Mann suffered mechanical/engine issues. The most serious issue of the day belonged to Mikhail Aleshin, who stopped on the course with an engine fire.

Weather: , cloudy

Friday May 16 – Fast Friday Practice

Rain kept the cars off the track most of the day, and allowed only a 19-minute practice session on Fast Friday. It was the first 230 mph lap at the Speedway since 2003. All cars were permitted 140 kPa of turbocharger "boost" during practice on Friday, up from 130 kPa allowed Sunday through Thursday. No incidents were reported. Six different drivers topped the speed chart on each of the six practice days.

Weather: , rain

Time trials

First Day – Saturday May 17
Ed Carpenter set the fastest qualifying speed of the day, leading the nine drivers who advanced to the Fast Nine Shootout on Sunday.

Weather: , partly cloudy

Second Day – Sunday May 18
The second day of time trials set the starting grid for positions 10 through 33, and then featured the Fast Nine Shootout. During the early session, Juan Pablo Montoya set the fastest time, and qualified for the 10th position. The 33-car field average was  — the fastest overall average in "500" history.

Weather: TBA

Post-qualifying practice and Carb Day

Monday May 19 – Post-qualifying practice

The 33 qualified cars participated in a post-qualifying practice session on Monday from 12 noon until 5 p.m. The drivers completed 2,329 laps with Josef Newgarden fastest of the day. At 1:35 p.m. Kurt Busch's car got loose in turn two, he lost control, and crashed into the outside wall at the exit of turn two. The car had heavy damage on the right side, but Busch was uninjured.

Weather: , partly sunny

Friday May 23 – Carb Day practice
All 33 drivers took laps during the final 60-minute practice session. Target Chip Ganassi Racing teammates Tony Kanaan and Scott Dixon led the speed chart. One minor incident involved rookie Sage Karam, who lightly brushed the outside wall in the exit of turn four. The car suffered only very minor damage.

Weather:

Friday May 23 – Pit Stop Challenge
The annual TAG Heuer Pit Stop Challenge was held Friday May 23. A total of twelve drivers/teams qualified. The teams of Takuma Sato, Will Power, Scott Dixon, and Helio Castroneves, received first-round byes, and advanced directly to the quarterfinals. Chip Ganassi Racing with driver Scott Dixon defeated Dreyer & Reinbold-Kingdom Racing (Sage Karam) in the final round to win the annual tournament.

Source:

Starting grid
(R) = Indianapolis 500 rookie; (W) = Former Indianapolis 500 winner

Race summary

Start
Race morning dawned with blue skies, and no chance of rain. Mari Hulman George and Jim Nabors gave the command to start engines together, and pace car driver Dario Franchitti led the field on the parade and pace laps. A clean start saw James Hinchcliffe grab the lead into turn one. Exiting turn two, Ryan Briscoe nearly spun and crashed, but kept the car under control without incident.

Hinchcliffe led the first nine laps, then polesitter Ed Carpenter took the lead on lap 10. Unlike the previous year, lead changes were at a minimum in the opening laps.

First half
The race went caution free for the first 149 laps. It marked the longest stretch of consecutive laps without a caution since before records were kept beginning in 1976. It also set a record for most consecutive laps from the start of the race before the first yellow. The modern era record was 66 laps in 2000, while the 1954 race reportedly went 110 laps before the first yellow caution period.

The field shuffled through several green-flag pit stops, while only two cars dropped out in the first half. Graham Rahal retired after 44 laps, suffering from electrical issues which kept shutting off the engine. Buddy Lazier was sidelined with clutch issues, but not before he moved into 7th place all-time in laps/miles completed at Indy.

On lap 66, Tony Kanaan's chances of winning were dashed. He ran out of fuel, but made it back to the pits. He returned to the track after a lengthy 43-second pit stop, but was back in the pits seven laps later with a broken starter. Kanaan fell 18 laps down as the crew made repairs.

At the halfway point, leader Ryan Hunter-Reay set a new record with an average speed of 211.871 mph.

Second half
A spin-out and crash involving Charlie Kimball on lap 149 brought out the first yellow flag. The leaders pitted, and the green came back out on lap 158. Ten laps later, Scott Dixon crashed in turn four, bringing out the second caution of the day. Dixon's crash snapped a streak of 1,733 consecutive laps completed at Indy, dating back to the start of the 2006 race.

The green came out for a restart with 25 laps to go. Ryan Hunter-Reay led Ed Carpenter, Townsend Bell, James Hinchcliffe, and Hélio Castroneves. As the field jockeyed down the main stretch, Hunter-Reay led into turn one. Directly behind him, Carpenter and Bell went side-by-side going into turn one. At that moment, Hinchcliffe dove to the inside, making it three-abreast into turn one. Hinchcliffe touched with Carpenter, sending both cars spinning and crashing into the outside wall. Bell, Castroneves, and the rest of the field slipped by unscathed. After the race, Carpenter angrily said "if he didn't have a concussion last week I would have punched him in the face."

Red flag
The green came out on lap 180, with Ryan Hunter-Reay leading. The lead shuffled quickly between Marco Andretti, Hélio Castroneves, and then back to Hunter-Reay. Then on lap 191, Townsend Bell crashed hard into the outside wall at the exit of turn two, damaging the SAFER barrier. With less than nine laps remaining, officials elected to put out the red flag and halted the race to allow workers to clean up the incident, repair the barrier, and allow the opportunity for a green flag finish. Considerable debris, along with damage to the SAFER Barrier and catchfence, required a red flag of nearly 11 minutes.

The red flag drew some mild controversy, but it was generally praised by most fans and competitors in the effort to prevent the race from finishing under caution. Eight of the previous twelve Indy 500s had finished under caution due to a late-race crash or rain.

Finish
The cars re-fired and took two yellow warm-up laps. The green came with six laps to go. Ryan Hunter-Reay led the field into turn one, Hélio Castroneves tucked into second, with Marco Andretti close behind in third. The leaders started taking an extremely low line down the front and back straights, forcing their competitors to make passes to the outside.

With five laps to go, Castroneves made a slingshot pass on the inside, and took the lead into turn one. Andretti challenged Hunter-Reay going into turn three, but was unable to make the pass. On the next time by the start/finish line, Castroneves was able to maintain the lead going into turn one. The top three cars stayed nose-to-tail going down the backstretch, at which time Hunter-Reay made a daring dive pass below the white line to take the lead going into turn three. The field crossed the start/finish line for three laps to go with Hunter-Reay leading.

With two laps to go, Castroneves went to the outside to pass Hunter-Reay going into turn one to retake the lead. The two raced nose-to-tail, with Andretti fading in third. As the field came down the main stretch to receive the white flag, Hunter-Reay made a slingshot pass to the outside to again retake the lead. He pulled out to a lead down the backstretch, and Castroneves was unable to challenge going into turn 3. As they came off of turn four, Castroneves tried to close the gap, and drafted going down the main stretch. He made a move to the outside, but Hunter-Reay was able to hold off the challenge, and won the race by 0.0600 seconds. It was the second-closest finish in race history behind only 1992.

"This race was ridiculously close and competitive," Hunter-Reay said after the race. "Just glad I picked the right time to go." Andretti placed third, while Carlos Muñoz finished fourth. Juan Pablo Montoya placed fifth in his first Indy 500 since he won it in 2000. Kurt Busch completed the race in sixth place then flew to North Carolina for the Coca-Cola 600. His attempt to become the second driver to complete 1,100 miles in one day came up short when his engine blew later on at the Coca-Cola 600 just before the race's halfway point.

The win made Hunter-Reay the first American to win the Indianapolis 500 in eight years. Between Hunter-Reay, Andretti, and Muñoz, Andretti Autosport had three cars in the top four, and four of the top six with Kurt Busch as well.

Box score

Notes

 Points include qualification points from Time Trials, 1 point for leading a lap, and 2 points for most laps led.

Race statistics
Lead changes: 34 amongst 11 drivers

Broadcasting

Television
In the United States, ABC broadcast both feature races in the IndyCar Series during the Indianapolis 500 meeting. This marks the fiftieth consecutive year that ABC has broadcast the 500. ABC also carried time trials for the first time since 2008. Long-time NASCAR play-by-play announcer Allen Bestwick, who has worked the Brickyard 400 since 2001, made his Indy 500 debut for 2014. Previous anchor Marty Reid had retired from the network on September 29, 2013 following an error during the broadcast of the NASCAR Nationwide Series Kentucky 300 (a race that was worked by IMS Radio on the radio side). During pole qualifying on Sunday May 18, Dario Franchitti joined the ABC booth as guest analyst. Carb Day coverage was carried by NBC Sports Network, with Bob Varsha serving as announcer.

International broadcasters included Foxtel Speed in Australia, Bandeirantes in Brazil, Motors TV in France, Sport1US in Germany, GAORA Sports in Japan, ESPN in Latin America and BT Sport 2 in the United Kingdom.

Radio
Paul Page, who served as the radio announcer for the 500 from 1977–1987, and later the television announcer (1988–1998, 2002–2004) returned to the radio booth. He anchored the radio broadcast, replacing Mike King, who resigned after 2013. Veteran Indy driver Robbie Buhl joined Page for the broadcast as race analyst, substituting for normal IMS Radio analyst Pippa Mann, who was participating in the race. This was Buhl's only year on the broadcast, but he had covered IndyCar races (including Indy 500 time trials) on Versus for multiple seasons. After several years covering the pit area, Kevin Lee took the turn four position. Lee was substituting for Chris Denari, who missed the race due to commitments with the Pacers and Fever. Nick Yeoman reported from victory lane.

Page ushered in some changes to the broadcast upon his return. He re-instated the turn one reporting location, with Jerry Baker manning the position. Page also brought back his Delta Force Intros, made popular from his days on television. During commercial breaks, the famous out-cue was recited by Page himself. In the previous few years, driver-recorded and historical out-cues were used.

For the 2014 race, the network reached an audience of 11 million listeners, and was carried on 400 terrestrial radio affiliates.

1070 The Fan broadcast nightly beginning April 29 with Trackside with Curt Cavin and Kevin Lee, followed by Donald Davidson's The Talk of Gasoline Alley. However, several episodes of each were pre-empted due to Pacers playoff coverage. About two months after the race, veteran broadcaster, and former IMS Radio Network announcer Gary Lee died. Lee had been part of the broadcast from 1990–1998.

Footnotes

Works cited
IndyCar.com
IndyStar.com
WFNI 1070 The Fan 
Weather.com – Speedway, Indiana

References

External links

Indianapolis 500 races
Indianapolis 500
Indianapolis 500
Indianapolis 500
Indianapolis 500